AustLit: The Australian Literature Resource (also known as AustLit: Australian Literature Gateway; and AustLit: The Resource for Australian Literature), usually referred to simply as AustLit, is an internet-based, non-profit collaboration between researchers and librarians from Australian universities, led by the University of Queensland (UQ), designed to comprehensively record the history of Australian literary and story-making cultures. AustLit is an encyclopaedia of Australian writers and writing.

BlackWords is a landmark research project by and within AustLit that details the lives and work of Indigenous Australian authors, which includes Australian Aboriginal and Torres Strait Islander writers and storytellers.

History 
AustLit was founded in 2000, when several independent databases on a variety of themes related to literary studies was created from work done by research groups at eight universities. The first dataset comprised about 300,000 fairly simple biographical and bibliographical records, many in the form of indexes to magazines, newspapers and scholarly journals. Initially led by UNSW at ADFA, the University of Queensland has led the consortium since 2002. Most of the indexing has been done at UQ since 2014.

It has been funded by participating universities, with various projects funded by the Australian Research Council (ARC). One example of ARC funding was  provided for an 2008 project to complete the retrospective record of Australian book history, establish a new resource for historical research on children's literature, and to further develop the database of Indigenous Australian writers and story tellers (see BlackWords below).

Owing to funding cuts to the participating universities, AustLit had to make a change to its indexing policies from 2017, including a reduction in the number of periodicals indexed. Other periodicals publication details are still provided, but indexing of 
individual items published in the large number of anthologies, selected and collected works, and periodicals can no longer be done. as there are not enough paid indexers at each institution. However, there is a system whereby volunteers can help to index these works.

Organisation and governance
Names have varied over time. While the official name is AustLit: The Australian Literature Resource, it has also been known as AustLit: Australian Literature Gateway and AustLit: The Resource for Australian Literature, but the organisation, website and database are generally referred to simply as AustLit.

Partner universities include the University of New South Wales, the University of Sydney, Flinders University (in Adelaide), the University of Wollongong, James Cook University (North Queensland), and the University of Western Australia, and the National Library of Australia is also a collaborating partner. UQ's School of Communication and Arts provide most of AustLit's "core non-operational funding, infrastructure, office, and administrative support", and is the central point of contact, while the partner universities provide supporting infrastructure.

Kerry Kilner, who was involved with the project since 1999, has been director of AustLit since 2002. Anita Heiss is director of Blackwords.

Coverage and activities 

AustLit publishes biographical entries and brief essays on Australian writers, critics and storytellers, organisational histories relating to publishers, theatre companies and other arts organisations, arts and other cultural festivals, and complete bibliographical histories of works of fiction and criticism. Its coverage includes the history and other details of many Australian periodicals.

BlackWords, separately published database within AustLit, covers all aspects of Indigenous Australian literature,  there were approximately 24,000 indexed works by nearly 7000 authors and organisations indexed on the database, and there are also thousands of full-text works, including The BlackWords Essays, by Anita Heiss. There are many interviews with Indigenous Australian authors, and teaching and educational guides and content.

It also has an active digitisation program to generate full-text versions of out-of-print and out-of-copyright literary works and critical articles about Australian literature; it provides full-text access to samples of works published from 1795. AustLit also provides access to full-text material hosted by other platforms, including Trove, libraries and other publicly available digitisation projects, as well as electronically published works.

In addition to providing access to already-published works, AustLit publishes new scholarly texts and datasets in digital format, for example its Anthology of Criticism, Beyond Goggles and Corsets: Australian Steampunk and Settler Colonial Literature.

The Australian Multicultural Writers subset includes thousands of writers whose cultural backgrounds are other than Anglo-Celtic.

The South Australian Women Writers dataset contains thousands of records migrated from the original Bibliography of South Australian Women Writers, compiled by Anne Chittleborough, Rick Hosking and Graham Tulloch of Flinders University and published electronically in 1999 by the State Library of South Australia. It was added to AustLit in 2000, and has continued to grow thanks to AustLit contributors. Flinders is primarily responsible for the further development of this subset.

Changes in coverage over time
Over time, some inclusion criteria have widened, for example:
As part of the development of BlackWords in 2007, oral histories and life story works started to be included.
The Australian Popular Theatre dataset led to the inclusion of burlesque theatre works.
The Colonial Newspapers and Magazines Project added advertisements, and also the works of international authors
The coverage of scriptwriters in the film and television industry was extended in 2010, together with production history of associated works.

Use in research
AustLit Research Communities support detailed explorations of particular aspects of Australia's literary culture. Researchers can work within AustLit to create datasets around a specific field. These projects range across book, magazine and publishing histories, subject specific surveys of regionally-based publishing and thematically-based subsets. Research into the history of Australian popular and pulp fiction is supported alongside research into theatre history, drama and multicultural writers. 

AustLit has become a key information resource for the study of Australian literature and related fields. Because of its status as the most comprehensive record of a nation's publishing history, AustLit has become an important source of data for analysing Australian literary history.

Usage
AustLit subscriber include research and educational institutions, and libraries, which allow home access for their member communities and subscribers. Limited guest usage is allowed, and the general public can access five pages per day.
 
Subscribers can electronically export data from AustLit by subscribers.

The US Library of Congress has archived snapshots of the AustLit website since 2009 as part of its Web Archive collection.

AustLit's copyright policy is that it is free for use under the Creative Commons License: Attribution-Noncommercial 3.0 Australia.

References

Further reading

External links 
 

Australian literature
Literature databases
Online databases
Databases in Australia
2000 establishments in Australia